Stanley Pierre Nsoki (born 9 April 1999) is a French professional footballer who plays as a defender for  club Hoffenheim.

Club career

Paris Saint-Germain 
Nsoki developed through the Paris Saint-Germain academy. He made his Ligue 1 debut on 20 December 2017 in a match against Caen. He came on for Marquinhos in the 65th minute of a 3–0 home win.

Nice
On 31 August 2019, Nsoki joined Nice in a transfer worth €12.5 million.

Club Brugge
Nsoki joined Belgian champions Club Brugge on 24 July 2021, signing a multi-year deal. He made his debut for the club on 1 August, in a 1–0 league victory over Union SG.

Hoffenheim 
On 4 August 2022, Nsoki joined Bundesliga outfit Hoffenheim.

International career
Nsoki was born in France and is of Congolese descent. Nsoki is a youth international for France.

Career statistics

Honours
Paris Saint-Germain
Ligue 1: 2017–18, 2018–19
Coupe de France: 2017–18; runner-up: 2018–19
Coupe de la Ligue: 2017–18
Trophée des Champions: 2018

References

External links
 France profile at FFF
 

1999 births
Living people
People from Poissy
Footballers from Yvelines
Black French sportspeople
French footballers
France under-21 international footballers
France youth international footballers
Association football defenders
Paris Saint-Germain F.C. players
OGC Nice players
Club Brugge KV players
TSG 1899 Hoffenheim players
Ligue 1 players
Belgian Pro League players
Bundesliga players
French expatriate footballers
Expatriate footballers in Belgium
French expatriate sportspeople in Belgium
Expatriate footballers in Germany
French expatriate sportspeople in Germany